This article provides a list of scientific, nationwide public opinion polls that were conducted relating to the 1968 United States presidential election.

Presidential election

Richard Nixon vs Hubert Humphrey vs George Wallace

Hypothetical Polling

Richard Nixon vs Eugene McCarthy vs George Wallace

Richard Nixon vs Lyndon Johnson vs George Wallace

Richard Nixon vs Lyndon Johnson vs George Wallace vs Eugene McCarthy

Richard Nixon vs Robert Kennedy vs George Wallace

Nelson Rockefeller vs Hubert Humphrey vs George Wallace

Nelson Rockefeller vs Eugene McCarthy vs George Wallace

Nelson Rockefeller vs Robert Kennedy vs George Wallace

Notes

References 

Opinion polling for elections
1968 United States presidential election